General Lavalle Partido is the second-easternmost partido of Buenos Aires Province in Argentina.

The partido is named after Juan Lavalle, who was a military and political figure in the early years of the Argentine state.

Settlements
General Lavalle
Pavón
Chacras de General Lavalle

References

External links

 
 online radio station

1865 establishments in Argentina
Partidos of Buenos Aires Province